Mercy High School is a private, all-girls, Roman Catholic high school in Omaha, Nebraska, United States, sponsored by the Sisters of Mercy.  It is located in the Roman Catholic Archdiocese of Omaha.  It is the only high school in Omaha with a negotiated tuition program, so each family meets with the President at the start of each academic year to agree upon what they will pay for tuition.  Mercy has approximately 385 students, 27 percent of whom are minorities. 98 percent of the graduating class goes on to college.

Background
Mercy High School is one of 41 high schools owned and operated by the Sisters of Mercy.

Activities
Omaha Mercy is a member of the Nebraska School Activities Association.  The school has won the following NSAA State Championships:

 Girls' volleyball – 1978
 Girls' basketball – none (runner-up 1981)
 Girls' soccer – none (runner-up 2007)
 Speech – none (runner-up 2009)

Notable alumni 

Symone D. Sanders, Senior Advisor and Chief Spokesperson to the Vice President of the United States, Senior Advisor to the Joe Biden 2020 presidential campaign, National Press Secretary for the Bernie Sanders 2016 presidential campaign

References

External links
 School website

Girls' schools in Nebraska
High schools in Omaha, Nebraska
Catholic secondary schools in Nebraska
Roman Catholic Archdiocese of Omaha
Sisters of Mercy schools